Swann Glacier is a broad glacier of undetermined length flowing east into Wright Inlet to the north of Mount Tricorn, on the east coast of Palmer Land. The glacier was discovered and photographed from the air in December 1940 by members of East Base of the United States Antarctic Service (USAS). During 1947 it was photographed from the air by members of the Ronne Antarctic Research Expedition (RARE), under Ronne, who in conjunction with the Falkland Islands Dependencies Survey (FIDS) charted it from the ground. Named by Ronne for W.F.G. Swann, Director of the Barthol Research Foundation of Franklin Institute at Swarthmore, PA, a contributor to the expedition.

Glaciers of Palmer Land